"Everybody's Got to Learn Sometime" is a 1980 single written by James Warren and first performed by British pop band the Korgis; Warren was lead singer in the band. It has subsequently been covered by numerous other artists.

Background
"Everybody's Got to Learn Sometime" features a distinctive synthesizer line as primary sound, based on a prominent keyboards arrangement played by Phil Harrison.

The song also is notable for its simple and sparse lyrics, but with a direct message. Related to this, lead singer and bassist James Warren has said that the song took only 10 or 15 minutes to write, literally singing the first thing to come into his mind, as he played both the chords and melodies on the piano. Producer David Lord subsequently added the big arrangement and strings.

The distinctive instrument played after each chorus is the eighteen-string Chinese zither known as a guzheng. Added to this, the song also features a brief instrumental section of violin in the middle, as well some pizzicatos after each chorus.

About the song meaning, Warren said:
At that time I was into new wave philosophies about working on yourself, meditation and that sort of stuff. The whole lyric comes out of that. It wasn’t a romantic song at all. For me it was all about an individual changing and being a different sort of person – trying to find out the root of your inner confusion, dealing with it and becoming a better person. So it was literally a philosophical lyric.

Releases
The song was released on 11 April 1980 from the group's second album, Dumb Waiters. The single reached #5 on the UK Singles Chart and #18 on the US Billboard Hot 100 chart. The song topped the singles charts at #1 in France and #1 in Spain, and charted at #5 in Ireland, #6 in Switzerland, #11 in The Netherlands, #11 in Australia, #12 in New Zealand, and #14 in Belgium. This represented the peak of the Korgis' music chart success.

The original 1980 version of "Everybody's Got to Learn Sometime" appears on the following compilation albums and CDs:
 The Best of The Korgis (1983)
 Archive Series (1997)
 Greatest Hits (2001)
 Don't Look Back – The Very Best of The Korgis (CD1) (2 CD) (2003)

In 1990, Warren and multi-instrumentalist Andrew Cresswell-Davis (a.k.a. Andy Davis) reformed the Korgis to re-record "Everybody's Got to Learn Sometime" for a charity album in support of the International Hostage Release Foundation. This version of the song appears on the compilation CD and DVD Kollection (2005).

The Korgis also recorded a live, acoustic version of "Everybody's Got to Learn Sometime" in the summer of 2005, which was intended for release on Kollection, but which eventually made its appearance in 2006 on the Unplugged CD.

An alternate version of "Everybody's Got to Learn Sometime" (with a different second verse) was included as a bonus track on the 1999 CD re-issue of 1980 album Dumb Waiters. This alternate version also appears on the compilations Klassics – The Best of The Korgis (2001) and Don't Look Back – The Very Best of The Korgis (CD2) (2 CD) (2003) which also includes an uptempo 3m 51s version of the song as its closing track, taking the total variants of the song on this double CD compilation to three.

When Warren and Davis reformed their first band, Stackridge, in 2007, they incorporated "Everybody's Got to Learn Sometime" into their set, Warren introducing it as a song he wrote for the Korgis. A live version by Stackridge was included in both the CD and DVD versions of The Forbidden City, recorded at one of the 2007 shows in Bath, England. Keyboardist Glenn Tommey and drummer Andy Marsden, both one-time backing musicians for The Korgis, were part of that incarnation of Stackridge.

Personnel
The Korgis
 James Warren – lead vocals, bass guitar, guzheng
 Stuart Gordon – electric guitar, violin
 Andy Davis – drums, bell tree
 Phil Harrison – keyboards

Charts

Weekly charts

Original version

1993 remix

Year-end charts

Baby D version

British electronic music group Baby D recorded a successful cover of the song, released as "(Everybody's Got to Learn Sometime) I Need Your Loving" on 22 May 1995 by Production House Records, as the fifth single from their only album, Deliverance (1996). It peaked at number three on the UK Singles Chart and was also a top 20 hit in Finland, Iceland, Ireland and Scotland. A partially black-and-white music video was produced to promote the single.

Critical reception
Pan-European magazine Music & Media wrote, "A female voice in the intro is the first variation on the Korgis' 1980 hit, then dub techniques and electronic percussion are used to take it to the jungle grand finale. "It kind of takes you by surprise," admits Red Rose Rock FM/Preston/Blackpool head of music Andy Roberts, "as it starts as a ballad and then becomes jungle, which is a very original way of updating an old hit. Now it's charted it proves that the popularity of jungle is no longer restricted to London." A reviewer from Music Week described it as "jungle pop which is right on track with this revamped version", remarking that "an impressive and melodic vocal complements the jungle beat." Jake Barnes from Muzik viewed it as "jungle-lite". The RM Dance Update declared it as "another catchy pop dance track that borrows from the past." An editor, James Hamilton, called it a "sure-fire smash hit attractively warbled junglistic remake".

Track listing
 Europe 12" single - 1995 issue on Systematic Records [SYSCD4]
"(Everybody's Got To Learn Sometime) I Need Your Loving" (R.A.F. Zone Mix)
"(Everybody's Got To Learn Sometime) I Need Your Loving" (Original Mix)
"(Everybody's Got To Learn Sometime) I Need Your Loving" (T.S.O.B. Mix)
"(Everybody's Got To Learn Sometime) I Need Your Loving" (Masters of House Mix)

 UK CD single - 1995 issue on Systematic Records [SYSCD4]
"(Everybody's Got To Learn Sometime) I Need Your Loving" (Radio Edit) — 4:10 
"(Everybody's Got To Learn Sometime) I Need Your Loving" (Original Mix) — 5:38 
"(Everybody's Got To Learn Sometime) I Need Your Loving" (T.S.O.B. Mix) — 6:26 
"(Everybody's Got To Learn Sometime) I Need Your Loving" (Neil Mclelland Mix) — 5:46 
"(Everybody's Got To Learn Sometime) I Need Your Loving" (Ray Keith No Sell Out Remix) — 5:28 
"(Everybody's Got To Learn Sometime) I Need Your Loving" (D-SP Remix) — 6:40

Charts and certifications

Weekly charts

Year-end charts

Certifications

Other versions
"Everybody's Got to Learn Sometime" has been covered many other times over the years, including several versions that reached the UK Singles Chart, most notably those by the Dream Academy (1987), Brian Davis (1991), Yazz (1994), Army of Lovers (2001) and the Cantamus Girls Choir (2005). NRG covered the song on their 1991 release The Real Hardcore. In 1997, a cappella group the King's Singers recorded the track with lead vocals by James Warren. In 2003, Erasure recorded the song on their cover album Other People's Songs.

In September 2004, Zucchero and Vanessa Carlton entered the French charts with their version of the song. That same year, Beck also covered the song for the Michel Gondry film Eternal Sunshine of the Spotless Mind.

In May 2005, Zucchero and Lara Fabian performed and recorded a live version of the song with a full orchestra for the Symphonic Show on French television.

In 2008 Glasgow indie band Glasvegas covered the song on the b-side of the second 7" of Geraldine. 

Richard Thompson covered the song as part of his 1000 Years of Popular Music tour in 2009, describing it on stage as the only good song to have been released in the 1980s.

Charts

Yazz

Cantamus Girls Choir

Zucchero & Vanessa Carlton

References

External links
  The Official band website
 .
 Songfacts

1980 songs
1980 singles
1995 singles
The Korgis songs
Baby D (dance group) songs
Beck songs
Vanessa Carlton songs
Zucchero Fornaciari songs
Pop ballads
New wave ballads
Synth-pop ballads
1980s ballads
British soft rock songs
Number-one singles in France
Number-one singles in Spain
Asylum Records singles
Production House Records singles